Ted Corbitt (January 31, 1919 – December 12, 2007) was an American long-distance runner. The first African-American to run the marathon at the Summer Olympics (the 1952 Olympics in Helsinki, Finland) and the founding president of New York Road Runners, Corbitt is often called  "the father of American long distance running." He was also an ultramarathon pioneer, helping to revive interest in the sport in the United States in the 1960s and 1970s. New York Times columnist Robert Lipsyte called Corbitt a "spiritual elder of the modern running clan". In a Runner's World feature honoring lifetime achievement,  writer Gail Kislevitz called Corbitt a "symbol of durability and longevity". Corbitt was among the first five runners to be inducted into the National Distance Running Hall of Fame, and the first to be inducted into the American Ultrarunning Hall of Fame.

Personal and professional life
The grandson of slaves, Corbitt was born on a cotton farm near Dunbarton, South Carolina. He ran shorter track events in high school and at the University of Cincinnati. Due to the racial discrimination common at the time, he was sometimes banned from track meets when white athletes refused to compete against him, nor was he sometimes able to stay in the same lodgings while traveling to competitions, even in the South during the 1950s. After army service in World War II, attending on the G.I. Bill, Corbitt earned a graduate degree in physical therapy from New York University, where he later lectured. He was a physiotherapist for more than 40 years.

Corbitt never smoked and his only drink was a single can of beer while in the army. He practiced self-massage, carefully chewed every mouthful of food, and drank much water. He was a soft-spoken and gentle man who rarely spoke. He was an avid photographer and would attend many athletic events sporting a 35-mm camera until he died, in Houston, Texas.

Racing and training 
Corbitt joined the nation's first integrated running organization, the New York Pioneer Club, in 1947. In 1951, he completed his first of 22 Boston Marathons, in 2:48.42. He competed in the Marathon at the 1952 Summer Olympics in Helsinki.  In January 1954, he won the Philadelphia Marathon, the first of his four wins in that city's event.  In May 1954,  he won the Yonkers Marathon, becoming the U.S. National Marathon Champion.  At various times, Corbitt held the U.S. distance running records for 25 miles, the marathon, 40 miles, 50 miles and 100 miles. He remained a nationally competitive runner well into his fifties. On April 15, 1974, Corbitt finished his last Boston Marathon at age 55. His time of 2:49:16 was only 34 seconds slower than his 1951 time. In the 1974 race, he wore patches and wires on his chest for a medical experiment done by San Francisco physician-researcher and pioneer female marathoner, Dr. Joan Ullyot. He competed in 223 marathons in his extended career.

For many years, Corbitt ran more than 20 miles a day from his home near Broadway and the Harlem River, in The Bronx, New York City, to his office in downtown Manhattan. On some days, he also ran back home. At his peak, Corbitt ran up to 200 miles a week, far more than almost any other distance runner, though workouts by his English contemporary, Arthur Keily, mirrored his exhausting regimen. Corbitt ran most of his training miles at a fast pace. One of his standard workouts involved running 17 miles on a track, followed by 13 miles on roads. During one week in 1962, Corbitt ran 300 miles. He then traveled to England and competed in the 54 mile London to Brighton road race, finishing fourth. In his final ultra-distance race, held in 2003, he completed 68 miles in a 24-hour race at Queens' Flushing Meadow Park.

Other contributions to running 
Corbitt served as an unpaid official of many running organizations, including the Amateur Athletic Union.  He was the co-founder and first president of the New York Road Runners and third President of Road Runners Club of America. He helped plan the New York City Marathon course. Corbitt served on various boards and committees for over 50 years.  He helped create the masters division for runners over 40.

In the early 1960s, Corbitt's influence was second to none in the adoption of precision measurement and certification of road race courses in the United States. Until that time, the practice had regularly been haphazard, with officials often simply driving a vehicle on a course and watching its speedometer. Corbitt's measurement method involved carefully calibrating a bicycle wheel, then riding the courses with it, mechanically counting the number of revolutions. This technique was based on the work of John Jewell of Great Britain. This Jones Counter method is still in use today.

In 2003, at 84, Corbitt completed a 24-hour race by walking 68 miles, finishing 17th in a field of 35. Some runners were awed by his presence; others had no idea who he was. At 87, he was still volunteering at ultramarathon races in New York and sometimes even competing. He continued to treat physiotherapy patients. At the time of his death, Corbitt had embarked on a project to walk all the streets of Manhattan.

Recognition 
In 1998, Corbitt was among the first five runners to be inducted into the National Distance Running Hall of Fame. Corbitt was also inducted into the American Ultrarunning Hall of Fame, on its inauguration in April 2006. USATF has named their annual "Men's Road Ultra Runner of the Year" award in his honor. In 2021, NYC Parks named a six mile stretch of Central Park the "Ted Corbitt Loop".

Biographies 
 Corbitt: The Story of Ted Corbitt, Long Distance Runner by John Chodes, Ishi Press 2010

References

Website Dedicated to Preserving the Legacy of Ted Corbitt - the History of Track & Field and Long Distance Running  http://tedcorbitt.com/

External links
 Ted Corbitt: Father of Long Distance Running Running Times Accessed 2009-10-08
 Marathon: Miles to Go and Promises to Keep  New York Times  
 Ted Corbitt: An Ultrarunning Pioneer Ultrarunning Magazine
 Ted Corbitt's 1964 monograph on road race course measurement

1919 births
2007 deaths
American male ultramarathon runners
American male long-distance runners
Olympic track and field athletes of the United States
Athletes (track and field) at the 1952 Summer Olympics
Athletes (track and field) at the 1955 Pan American Games
American masters athletes
American inventors
People from Barnwell County, South Carolina
University of Cincinnati alumni
United States Army soldiers
African-American inventors
Pan American Games track and field athletes for the United States
20th-century African-American sportspeople
21st-century African-American people